Paul Kee (born 21 February 1967) is a retired Irish footballer who played in numerous positions, including striker and midfielder. He is the former manager of Institute Football Club and current manager of Harland and Wolf Welders.

Football career
Kee, who was born in Derry, Northern Ireland, began his professional career with Mansfield Town, signing in the summer of 1983. He made his League debut for Mansfield in April 1985 against Chester City.  He remained with Mansfield for the remainder of the season and was then signed by Brian Clough for Nottingham Forest.

He left Forest in 1986 and had spells with Southampton and Charlton before returning home, where he signed for Linfield in 1987.  The spell with Linfield came to an end and he signed for Coleraine, with whom he won the Irish League Cup in 1987, defeating Portadown at The Oval. In the summer of 1989, Kee signed with Crusaders in his final season.

He later moved into management, enjoying stints with Institute and Carlisle, and managed the IFA under-17s, as well as County Performance Coach in Tyrone for the Irish Football Association

Since moving into coaching and management in 1988, Kee has amassed a wealth of coaching knowledge that he now uses in his varied roles as County Performance Coach, Northern Ireland U18 manager and Director of Maiden City Soccer Academy in Derry.

He currently hold a U.E.F.A. Pro licence and is Director of Maiden City Soccer in Derry. An organisation which has been involved in the development of such players as Darron Gibson (Everton) Shane Ferguson (Newcastle United) and Eunan O'Kane (AFC Bournemouth)

Career honours

As a player

Coleraine
Winner
 Irish League Cup 1987

As a manager
2013-14 NIFL Championship winner with Institute.
Northern Ireland Sportswriters ‘Guinness’ 1st Division Manager of the Year 2002
Promotion to Daily Mirror Premier League with Institute F.C. 2002 – Runners up to Lisburn Distillery
Craig Memorial Cup Winners 1999— Institute v Moyola Park at Limavady Showground’s
North West Senior Cup Winners 1998—Institute v Limavady United at Limavady Showground’s
Smirnoff Cup Winners 1997—Institute v Chimney Corner at Limavady Showground’s
McEwen’s Lager Soccer Sixes Winners 1994—Omagh Town v Glenavon at Dundonald Ice Bowl
Tyrone Cup Winner 1993—Omagh Town v Dungannon Swifts at Stangmore Park
Budweiser Cup Winners 1991—Omagh Town v Linfield at The Oval Belfast

References

1967 births
Living people
Mansfield Town F.C. players
Linfield F.C. players
Coleraine F.C. players
Crusaders F.C. players
NIFL Premiership players
English Football League players
Sportspeople from Derry (city)
Football managers from Northern Ireland
Association football midfielders
Association footballers from Northern Ireland